This article is about the demographic features of the population of Turkey, including population density, ethnicity, education level, health of the populace, economic status, religious affiliations and other aspects of the population.

 the population of Turkey was 85.2 million with a growth rate of 0.55% per annum. Turks are the largest ethnic group, followed by Kurds.

The population has been quite young in recent times but is now aging, with just 22% falling in the 0–14 age bracket (down from 26.4% in 2007). The population over the age of 65 is 9.9% (up from 7.1% in 2007).  the median age of the Turkish population is 33.5 years (up from 28.3 in 2007). According to OECD/World Bank population statistics, from 1990 to 2008 the population growth in Turkey was 16 million or 29%.

Population

Life expectancy

Source: UN

Vital statistics

UN estimates
The figures from the UN Department of Economic and Social Affairs:

Registered births and deaths
Birth statistics of Turkey from 2001 onward are from the Central Population Administrative System (MERNIS) database which is available on-line. Birth statistics are updated continually because MERNIS has dynamic structure.

In 2010 Turkey had a crude birth rate of 17.2 per 1000, in 2011 16.7, down from 20.3 in 2001. The total fertility rate (TFR) in 2010 was 2.05 children per woman, in 2011 2.02. The crude birth rate in 2010 ranged from 11.5 per 1,000 in West Marmara (TFR 1.52) (11,5;1.55 in 2011), similar to neighbouring Bulgaria, to 27.9 per 1,000 in Southeast Anatolia (TFR 3.53) (27.1;3,42 in 2011), similar to neighbouring Syria. Similarly, in 2012, the TFR ranged from 1.43 in Kırklareli, to 4.39 in Şanlıurfa. Death statistics from MERNIS are available as of 2009. Mortality data prior to 2009 are incomplete.

Birth and death rate by region and year

Total births and deaths by region and year

Natural increase by region and year

Historical fertility rate
	 
Fertility Rate (TFR) (Wanted Fertility Rate) and CBR (Crude Birth Rate):

Total fertility rate by region in Turkey by Turkish General Census (GNS) and Turkish population and health research (TNSA).

Total fertility rate (TFR) by province and year
	 
Figures from Turkish Statistical Institute (TurkStat):

Structure of the population
	 
Structure of the population (31.XII.2015):

	 
Structure of the population (31.XII.2016):

Structure of the population (31.XII.2017):

Structure of the population (31.XII.2018):

Structure of the population (31.XII.2019):

Population Estimates by Sex and Age Group (31.XII.2020):

Population Estimates by Sex and Age Group (31.XII.2021):

Immigration 

Immigration to Turkey is the process by which people migrate to Turkey to reside in the country. After the dissolution of the Ottoman Empire and following Turkish War of Independence, an exodus by the large portion of Turkish (Turkic) and Muslim peoples from the Balkans (Balkan Turks, Albanians, Bosniaks, Pomaks), Caucasus (Abkhazians, Ajarians, Circassians, Chechens), Crimea (Crimean Tatar diaspora), and Crete (Cretan Turks) took refuge in present-day Turkey and moulded the country's fundamental features. Trends of immigration towards Turkey continue to this day, although the motives are more varied and are usually in line with the patterns of global immigration movements — Turkey, for example, receives many economic migrants from nearby countries such as Armenia, the Moldova, Georgia, Iran, and Azerbaijan, but also from Central Asia, Ukraine and Russia. Turkey's migrant crisis during the 2010s saw high numbers of people arriving in Turkey, particularly those fleeing the Syrian civil war.

In order to obtain Turkish citizenship there is a range of legal grounds, which can include: reunification with their family, marriage to a Turkish citizen, for the purchase of real estate worth $400,000 from a Turkish citizen or company. The minimum investment amount was increased in May 2022, previously it was enough to invest $250,000. Also the basis is to work in Turkey, training, business, medical treatment, refugee status.

Population in Turkey by country of citizenship by the end of each years:

Internal migration

Ethnic groups and languages 

No exact data is available concerning the different ethnic groups in Turkey. The last census data according to language date from 1965 and major changes may have occurred since then. However, it is clear that the Turkish are in the majority, while the largest minority groups are Kurds and Arabs. Smaller minorities are the Armenians, Greeks and others.

The word Turk or Turkish also has a wider meaning in a historical context because, at times, especially in the past, it has been used to refer to all Muslim inhabitants of the Ottoman Empire irrespective of their ethnicity.

A possible list of ethnic groups living in Turkey could be as follows:

 Turkic-speaking peoples: Turks, Azerbaijanis, Tatars, Karachays, Uzbeks, Crimean Tatars and Uyghurs
 Indo-European-speaking peoples: Kurds, Zazas, Megleno-Romanians, Bosniaks, Albanians, Pomaks, Ossetians, Armenians, Hamshenis, Goranis and Greeks
 Semitic-speaking peoples: Arabs, Jews and Assyrians/Syriacs
 Caucasian-speaking peoples: Circassians, Georgians, Lazs and Chechens

According to the 2016 edition of the CIA World Factbook, 70–75% of Turkey's population consists of ethnic Turks, with Kurds accounting for 19% and other minorities between 6 and 11%.
According to Milliyet, a 2008 report prepared for the National Security Council of Turkey by academics of three Turkish universities in eastern Anatolia suggested that there are approximately 55 million ethnic Turks, 9.6 million Kurds, 3 million Zazas, 2.5 million Circassians, 2 million Bosniaks, 500,000–1.3 million Albanians, 1,000,000 Georgians, 870,000 Arabs, 600,000 Pomaks, 80,000 Laz, 60,000 Armenians, 30,000 British, 25,000 Assyrians/Syriacs, 20,000 Jews, and 15,000 Greeks, 500 Yazidis living in Turkey.

According to a survey published in 2022 by Konda Research, Turks make up 77% of the population, while 19% self-identify as Kurd. Arabs (Syrian refugees excluded) make up 2%, and other ethnic groups are 2% of the population.

Since the immigration to the big cities in the west of Turkey, interethnic marriage has become more common. A recent study estimates that there are 2,708,000 marriages between Turks and Kurds.

According to a survey done in March 2020 by Area Araştırma, 20.4% of the total population of Turkey claim to be Kurdish (either Kurmanji speaking or Zazaki speaking).

Ethnolinguistic estimates in 2014 by Ethnologue and Jacques Leclerc:

Scale of Ethnologue:

aExpanded Graded Intergenerational Disruption Scale (EGIDS) of Ethnologue:
0 (International): "The language is widely used between nations in trade, knowledge exchange, and international policy."
1 (National): "The language is used in education, work, mass media, and government at the national level."
2 (Provincial): "The language is used in education, work, mass media, and government within major administrative subdivisions of a nation."
3 (Wider Communication): "The language is used in work and mass media without official status to transcend language differences across a region."
4 (Educational): "The language is in vigorous use, with standardization and literature being sustained through a widespread system of institutionally supported education."
5 (Developing): "The language is in vigorous use, with literature in a standardized form being used by some though this is not yet widespread or sustainable."
6a (Vigorous): "The language is used for face-to-face communication by all generations and the situation is sustainable."
6b (Threatened): "The language is used for face-to-face communication within all generations, but it is losing users."
7 (Shifting): "The child-bearing generation can use the language among themselves, but it is not being transmitted to children."
8a (Moribund): "The only remaining active users of the language are members of the grandparent generation and older."
8b (Nearly Extinct): "The only remaining users of the language are members of the grandparent generation or older who have little opportunity to use the language."
9 (Dormant): "The language serves as a reminder of heritage identity for an ethnic community, but no one has more than symbolic proficiency."
10 (Extinct): "The language is no longer used and no one retains a sense of ethnic identity associated with the language."

Religion 

There are no official statistics of people's religious beliefs nor is it asked in the census. According to the government, 99.8% of the Turkish population is Muslim, mostly Sunni, some 8 million are Alevis. The remaining 0.2% is other - mostly Christians and Jews. However, these are based on the existing religion information written on every citizen's national id card, that is automatically passed on from the parents to every newborn, and do not necessarily represent individual choice. Religious records can be changed or even blanked on the request of citizen, by filing an e-government application since May 2020, using a valid electronic signature to sign the electronic application. Any change in religion records additionally results in a new ID card being issued. Any change in religion record also leaves a permanent trail in the census record, however, record of change of religion is not accessible except for the citizen in question, next-of-kins of the citizen in question, the citizenship administration and courts.

In a poll conducted by Sabancı University in 2006, 98.3% of Turks revealed they were Muslim. A Eurobarometer Poll in 2005 reported that in a poll 98% of Turkish citizens answered that "they believe there is a God", while 1% responded that "they do not believe there is any sort of spirit, God, or life force". In a Pew Research Center survey, 53% of Turkey's Muslims said that "religion is very important in their lives". Based on the Gallup Poll 2006–08, Turkey was defined as More religious, in which over 63 percent of people believe religion is important. According to the Turkish Economic and Social Studies Foundation, 62% of women wear the headscarf or hijab in Turkey.

A poll conducted by Eurobarometer and KONDA and some other research institutes in 2013 showed that around 0.5% of the population had no religion. Another poll conducted by the same institutions in 2018 showed that 3% of those interviewed had no religion.

According to Ipsos survey, in 2016 Islam was the major religion in Turkey comprising 82% of the total population, followed by religiously unaffiliated people, comprising 13% of the population, and Christians, forming 0.2%.

Religious groups according to estimates:

The vast majority of the present-day Turkish people are Muslim and the most popular sect is the Hanafite school of Sunni Islam, which was officially espoused by the Ottoman Empire; according to the KONDA Research and Consultancy survey carried out throughout Turkey on 2007:

 52.8% defined themselves as "a religious person who strives to fulfill religious obligations" (Religious)
 34.3 % defined themselves as "a believer who does not fulfill religious obligations" (Not religious).
 9.7% defined themselves as "a fully devout person fulfilling all religious obligations" (Fully devout).
 2.3% defined themselves as "someone who does not believe in religious obligations" (Non-believer).
 0.9% defined themselves as "someone with no religious conviction" (Atheist).
In 2018 KONDA released a new study :
51% defined themselves as "a religious person who strives to fulfill religious obligations" (Religious)
34% defined themselves as "a believer who does not fulfill religious obligations" (Not religious).
10% defined themselves as "a fully devout person fulfilling all religious obligations" (Fully devout).
2% defined themselves as "someone who does not believe in religious obligations" (Non-believer).
3% defined themselves as "someone with no religious conviction" (Atheist).
Among those aged between 15 and 29 years old :

 43% defined themselves as "a religious person who strives to fulfill religious obligations" (Religious)
45% defined themselves as "a believer who does not fulfill religious obligations" (Not religious).
5% defined themselves as "a fully devout person fulfilling all religious obligations" (Fully devout).
4% defined themselves as "someone who does not believe in religious obligations" (Non-believer).
4% defined themselves as "someone with no religious conviction" (Atheist).

Census

Census of 1927

1965 census

Minorities 

Modern Turkey was founded by Mustafa Kemal Atatürk as secular (Laiklik, Turkish adaptation of French Laïcité), i.e. without a state religion, or separate ethnic divisions/ identities. The concept of "minorities" has only been accepted by the Republic of Turkey as defined by the Treaty of Lausanne (1923) and thence strictly limited to Greeks, Jews and Armenians, only on religious matters, excluding from the scope of the concept the ethnic identities of these minorities as of others such as the Kurds who make up 15% of the country; others include Assyrians/Syriacs of various Christian denominations, Alevis and all the others.

There are many reports from sources such as (Human Rights Watch, European Parliament, European Commission, national parliaments in EU member states, Amnesty International etc.) on persistent yet declining discrimination.

Certain current trends are:
 Turkish imams get salaries from the state, whereas Turkish Alevi as well as non-Orthodox and non-Armenian clerics are not paid.
 Imams can be trained freely at the numerous religious schools and theology departments of universities throughout the country; minority religions cannot re-open schools for training of their local clerics due to legislation and international treaties dating back to the end of Turkish War of Independence. The closing of the Theological School of Halki is a sore bone of contention between Turkey and the Eastern Orthodox world;
 The Turkish state sends out paid imams, working under authority from the Presidency of Religious Affairs (Diyanet İşleri Başkanlığı) to various European or Asian countries with Turkish- or Turkic-speaking populations, with as local heads officials from the Turkish consulates;
 Turkey has recently engaged in promulgating a series of legal enactments aiming at removal of the procedural hurdles before the use of several local languages spoken by Turkish citizens such as Kurdish (Kurmanji), Arabic and Zaza as medium of public communication, together with several other smaller ethnic group languages. A few private Kurdish teaching centers have recently been allowed to open. Kurdish-language TV broadcasts on 24/7 basis at the public frequency denominated in the government-owned TRT 6, while the private national channels show no interest yet. However, there are already several satellite Kurdish TV stations operating from Kurdish Autonomous Region at Northern Iraq and Western Europe, broadcasting in Kurdish, Turkish and Neo-Aramaic languages, Kurdistan TV, KurdSAT, etc.;
 Non-Muslim minority numbers are said to be falling rapidly, mainly as a result of aging, migration (to Israel, Greece, the United States and Western Europe).
There is concern over the future of the Greek Orthodox Patriarchate, which suffers from a lack of trained clergy due to the closure of the Halki school. The state does not recognise the Ecumenical status of the Patriarch of Constantinople.

According to figures released by the Foreign Ministry in December 2008, there are 89,000 Turkish citizens designated as belonging to a minority, two thirds of Armenian descent.

CIA World Factbook demographic statistics 
The following demographic statistics are from the CIA World Factbook:

Age structure
0–14 years: 24.26% (male 10,085,558/female 9,627,967)
15–24 years: 15.88% (male 6,589,039/female 6,311,113)
25–54 years: 43.26% (male 17,798,864/female 17,349,228)
55–64 years: 8.82% (male 3,557,329/female 3,606,120)
65 years and over: 7.79% (male 2,825,738/female 3,506,283) (2018 est.)

Median age
total population:
32.4 years
male:
31.7 years
female:
33.1 years (2019 est.)

Sex ratio
at birth:
1.05 male(s)/female
under 15 years:
1.05 male(s)/female
15–24 years:
1.04 male(s)/female
25–54 years:
1.03 male(s)/female
55–64 years:
0.99 male(s)/female
65 years and over:
0.8 male(s)/female
total population:
1.01 male(s)/female (2017 est.)

Life expectancy at birth
total population:
78.3 years
male:
75.6 years
female:
81.0 years (2019 est.)

Urbanization
urban population: 75.1% of total population (2018)
rate of urbanization: 2.04% annual rate of change (2015–20 est.)

Nationality
noun:
Turk(s)
adjective:
Turkish

Literacy
definition:
age 15 and over can read and write
total population: 96.2%
male: 98.8%
female: 93.6% (2016 est.)

See also 
Census in Turkey
Minorities in Turkey

References

Notes

External links

 Build Turkey population graph: from 1960 till now (World Bank data)
 Build Turkey population projection graph till 2100 (United Nation data)
 Build Turkey life expectancy at birth graph: from 1950 till now (United Nation data)